A Girl Thing is a 2001 American made-for-television drama directed by Lee Rose. Consisting of four separate stories, the film premiered on Showtime on January 20, 2001, and concluded on January 27. The ensemble cast includes Stockard Channing, Kate Capshaw, Elle Macpherson, Glenne Headly, Rebecca De Mornay, Allison Janney, Mia Farrow, Lynn Whitfield, Linda Hamilton, Camryn Manheim, and S. Epatha Merkerson.

Plot
The stories involve patients of psychiatrist Dr. Beth Noonan. The first part is about an attorney (Lauren Travis) who has problems with intimacy and realizes that she is attracted to another woman (Casey Montgomery), an advertising executive. The second is an angry woman (Helen McCormack) and her sisters (Kim and Kathy McCormack) who must all learn to get along to receive inheritances from their deceased mother. The third is a wife (Nia Morgan) who enlists the help of her husband's mistress (Betty McCarthy) and a decoy (Rachel Logan) in taking revenge against him. In the fourth story, Beth Noonan is held captive by a mentally disturbed patient (Suzanne Nabor).

Cast and characters
 Kate Capshaw as Casey Montgomery
 Stockard Channing as Dr. Beth Noonan
 Rebecca De Mornay as Kim McCormack
 Mia Farrow as Betty McCarthy
 Elizabeth Franz as Josephine McCormack
 Irma P. Hall as Alice, the housekeeper
 Linda Hamilton as Rachel Logan
 Glenne Headly as Helen McCormack
 Allison Janney as Kathy McCormack
 Tina Lifford as Sharon
 Elle Macpherson as Lauren Travis
 Camryn Manheim as Suzanne Nabor
 Margo Martindale as May
 S. Epatha Merkerson as Lani
 Kelly Rowan as Claire
 Lynn Whitfield as Nia Morgan
 Peta Wilson as Alex
 Scott Bakula as Paul Morgan
 Bruce Greenwood as Frank
 Brian Kerwin as Gary Tucker

Reception
The film received positive reviews from critics.

References

Further reading

External links

 A Girl Thing at Screenmusings

2001 television films
2001 films
American LGBT-related films
Lesbian-related films
Films shot in Vancouver
Showtime (TV network) films
American drama television films
Films directed by Lee Rose (director)
2000s American films